Mageia is a Linux-based operating system, distributed as free and open source software. It was forked from the Mandriva Linux distribution.  The Greek term  means enchantment, fascination, glamour, wizardry.

The first release of the software distribution, Mageia 1, took place in June 2011.

History 
Mageia was created in 2010 as a fork of Mandriva Linux, by a group of former employees of Mandriva S.A. and several other members of the Mandriva community.

On September 2, 2010, Edge IT, one of the subsidiaries of Mandriva, was placed under liquidation process by the Tribunal de commerce in Paris; effective September 17, all assets were liquidated and employees were let go.

The next day, on September 18, 2010, some of these former employees, who were mostly responsible for the development and maintenance of the Mandriva Linux distribution, and several community members announced the creation of Mageia, with the support of many members of the community of developers, users and employees of Mandriva Linux.

Desktop environments 
Mageia can use all major desktop environments. As was the case with Mandrake and Mandriva Linux, KDE is the main and the most used environment. End-users can choose from KDE and GNOME 64 bit Live DVD editions, 32 bit and 64 bit Xfce live DVD editions, and any environment in the full DVD installation edition.

It uses Mageia Control Center.  LXDE, LXQt, Cinammon, MATE and Enlightenment are also available.

Application repository 
Mageia offers a very large repository of software, such as productivity applications and a large variety of games. It was the first Linux distribution in which MariaDB replaced Oracle's MySQL.

Development 
Mageia was originally planned to be released on a nine-month release cycle, with each release to be supported for 18 months.

Actual practice has been to release a new version when the Mageia development community feels the new release is ready from quality and stability viewpoints. 

The latest stable version is Mageia 8, released on 26 February 2021.

Version history

See also   
 OpenMandriva Lx—a Linux distribution based on Mandriva Linux  
 PCLinuxOS—another Linux distribution now independent, but whose start was based on Mandriva Linux  
 Unity Linux—Mandriva-based distribution designed to be a base for end-user distributions

References

External links 

 
 Official wiki
 
Mageia on OpenSourceFeed Gallery

KDE
Mandriva Linux
RPM-based Linux distributions
X86-64 Linux distributions
Linux distributions